Altus is a city in and the county seat of Jackson County, Oklahoma, United States. The population was 18,729 at the 2020 census.

Altus is home to Altus Air Force Base, the United States Air Force training base for C-17, KC-46 and KC-135 aircrews. It is also home to Western Oklahoma State College and Southwest Technology Center.

History
The town that would later be named Altus was founded in 1886. The community was originally called "Frazer", a settlement of about 50 people on Bitter Creek that served as a trading post on the Great Western Cattle Trail. Cowboys driving herds northward often stopped to buy buttermilk from John McClearan. Thus, the town was known locally as "Buttermilk Station". The Frazer post office opened February 18, 1886. A flash flood nearly destroyed Frazer on June 4, 1891. W. R. Baucum suggested renaming the town "Altus", a Latin word meaning "high". This name stuck, although the town was also known as "Leger" from July 10, 1901, to May 14, 1904.

The population doubled between the time of Oklahoma statehood and the 1910 census and even increased during the Great Depression. Although Altus had been designated as the Jackson county seat at the time of statehood, an election was held in 1908 to determine the permanent seat. The two towns contending were Altus and Olustee. Altus won by a vote of 2,077 to 1,365. The county courthouse was built there in 1910. An irrigation project in the 1940s and World War II led to further growth in the town as the nearby airfield was used to train military pilots.

In 1908, the Kansas City, Mexico and Orient Railway (acquired by the Atchison, Topeka and Santa Fe Railway in 1929) built a line through Altus. Around the same time, the Altus, Wichita Falls and Hollis Railway (which became the Wichita Falls and Northwestern Railway in 1911, then was acquired by the Missouri, Kansas and Texas Railway in 1922) constructed a line from Altus to the Oklahoma-Texas border. The railroads stimulated economic growth in the area and made Altus a regional agricultural center. By 1930, Altus had eight cotton gins, two cotton compresses, and eighteen wholesale businesses.

Geography
Altus is located in northeastern Jackson County. It is situated in what used to be Old Greer County, an area with disputed ownership until a Supreme Court decision awarded it to Oklahoma Territory instead of Texas. The city lies between the main channel and North Fork of the Red River.

Climate
Altus has a humid subtropical climate (Köppen Cfa) bordering upon a semi-arid climate (BSk). Summers are very hot to sweltering, though occasionally heavy rainfall does occur due to remains of Gulf of Mexico hurricanes moving inland.

Autumn is brief, with generally very warm afternoons and comfortably cool mornings, while winter is extremely variable. Chinook winds can sometimes raise temperatures to uncomfortably hot even in the low winter sun, in the process often drying out vegetation to produce wildfires. On the other hand, if a block forms over the Gulf of Alaska very cold air can be driven into the Plains States from Canada, producing temperatures below  in extreme cases. Such cold temperatures on average occur once every three winters, although on average 78.5 mornings each year fall to or below the freezing point. Snowfall is rare and erratic: the most in a months being  in January 1966, while most rainfall comes during the unsettled spring season, when heavy thunderstorms can occur from the convergence of hot and cold air masses to produce very intense short-period rainfall.

Demographics

As of the census of 2010, there were 19,813 people living in the city.  The population density was 1,200 people per square mile (450/km).  There were 8,890 housing units at an average density of 540 per square mile (205/km).  The racial makeup of the city was 72.62% White, 10.41% African American, 1.48% Native American, 1.38% Asian, 0.20% Pacific Islander, 10.32% from other races, and 3.59% from two or more races. Hispanic or Latino of any race were 17.25% of the population.

There were 7,896 households, out of which 38.9% had children under the age of 18 living with them, 55.6% were married couples living together, 11.7% had a female householder with no husband present, and 28.7% were non-families. 25.1% of all households were made up of individuals, and 9.5% had someone living alone who was 65 years of age or older. The average household size was 2.62 and the average family size was 3.14.

In the city, the population was spread out, with 29.8% under the age of 18, 11.0% from 18 to 24, 29.8% from 25 to 44, 17.9% from 45 to 64, and 11.5% who were 65 years of age or older. The median age was 32 years. For every 100 females, there were 98.9 males. For every 100 females age 18 and over, there were 94.1 males.

The median income for a household in the city was $30,217, and the median income for a family was $38,400. Males had a median income of $28,041 versus $18,856 for females. The per capita income for the city was $15,378. About 14.6% of families and 17.2% of the population were below the poverty line, including 22.7% of those under age 18 and 12.8% of those age 65 or over.

Transportation
U.S. Routes 62 and 283 cross in the center of Altus. US 62 leads east  to Lawton, and west  to Childress, Texas, while US 283 leads north  to Mangum, and south  to Vernon, Texas.

Altus/Quartz Mountain Regional Airport (KAXS; FAA ID: AXS), 3 miles to the north, has a 5501’ x 75’ paved runway.

Commercial air transportation is available at the Lawton-Fort Sill Regional Airport, about 57 miles to the east.

The Wichita, Tillman and Jackson Railway provides rail freight service.

Points of interest
 Morgan Doll Museum
 Altus Air Force Base

Education
The public schools of Altus are in Oklahoma School District number 18. In the Altus Public School District there are nine schools, including five elementary schools, an intermediate school, a junior high school, a high school, and a learning center. For the 2011–2012 school year there were approximately 3,851 students.

Western Oklahoma State College and Southwest Technology Center provide opportunities for higher education in the area.

Notable people

 Robert N. Bellah, sociologist of religion
 Jake Colhouer, American football player
 Mark Cotney, National Football League (NFL) player (Tampa Bay Buccaneers)
 Herschal Crow, Oklahoma state senator
 Brandon Dickerson, music video director
 Eddie Fisher, relief pitcher
 Suzi Gardner, guitarist for the band L7
 Kelly Garrison, 1988 Olympic gymnast (competed as Kelly Garrison-Steves)
 Jason Gildon, NFL player; all-time sack leader for the Pittsburgh Steelers
 David Green, founder of Hobby Lobby
 Steve Marino, professional golfer who currently plays on the PGA Tour
 Moon Martin, singer and musician
 Richard Lee McNair, prisoner
 Thomas C. Oden, United Methodist theologian and religious author
 Juan Pérez, Major League Baseball player for the San Francisco Giants, played at Western Oklahoma State College
 Andrelton Simmons, shortstop, Los Angeles Angels, played at Western Oklahoma State College
 John Sterling, NFL player (Green Bay Packers and Denver Broncos)
 Rodney Yee, yoga instructor
 Samuel M. Sampler, World War I Medal of Honor Recipient

Gallery

References

External links
 City of Altus official website
 Western Oklahoma State College
 Altus information, photos and videos on TravelOK.com Official travel and tourism website for the State of Oklahoma

Cities in Jackson County, Oklahoma
Cities in Oklahoma
County seats in Oklahoma
Micropolitan areas of Oklahoma